The following is a list of episodes for the anime series Viewtiful Joe. The series was directed by Takaaki Ishiyama and produced by Group TAC. The series ran for fifty-one episodes on TV Tokyo from October 2, 2004 to September 24, 2005. Based on the video game series of the same name, the anime tells the story of an action film fan named Joe who is thrust into the world of movies and given the ability to transform into the tokusatsu superhero Viewtiful Joe.

The series was licensed by Geneon Entertainment for broadcast and distribution in North America and by MGM Television for the rest of the world. An English dub, consisting of the first twenty-six episodes, aired on Kids' WB! from November 5, 2005 to May 20, 2006, beginning with the fifth episode. In Japan, the first twenty-six episodes were released on DVD by Suleputer in seven separate volumes between February 23, 2005 and July 27, 2005. In North America, those same episodes were released by Geneon in eight separate volumes between February 7, 2006 and April 3, 2007. The first three episodes were also released on UMD by Geneon. The show additionally received a release in Latin America, where its first thirty-six episodes were released on nine DVDs by Focus Filmes.

The show features four pieces of vocal music, including two openings and two endings. The openings, both by SaGa, are "Brighter Side" for the first thirty-eight episodes and "Spirit Awake" for the remaining episodes. The first ending is "And You" by SaGa for the first thirty-eight episodes, and the second is "Shangri-La Village / Tougenkyou" by Amasia Landscape for the remainder of the series.

Note that only the first twenty-six episode titles are official. The others, which were not broadcast in English, are direct translations of the Japanese titles.



Season 1

Season 2 (Japanese version only)

References
General
 
 
 
 
 

Specific

Viewtiful Joe
Viewtiful Joe